The Battle of Jaffa can refer to:

The Taking of Joppa (1456 BC)
Battle of Jaffa (1192)
Siege of Jaffa (1798)
Battle of Jaffa (1917)
Battle of Jaffa (1948)
Operation Hametz